Mohammed bin Hashim al-Awadhy (Arabic: العوضي هاشم بن محمد) was a Qatari militant and the coordinator and promoter of the "Wa Atasemo for the Relief of Our People in Syria" Islamic charity organization. Mohammed was the son of Hisham al-Awadhy, a Qatari businessman. Mohammed was killed in battle in northeastern Syria in early 2015. It is believed that he was fighting with Ahrar al-Sham at the time, although ISIS supporters have also labeled al-Awadhy as a "martyr."

Family
Mohammed al-Awadhy was the son of Hashim al-Awadhy, Hashim al-Awadhy is the owner of Rabia TV, a media outlet in support of the Muslim Brotherhood, and serves as the Director of the Media Center at Eid Charity, an organization with ties to Hamas and founded by Specially Designated Global Terrorist al-Nuaymi.

Wa Atasemo for the Relief of Our People in Syria
"Wa Atasemo for the Relief of Our People in Syria" is a defunct Islamic charitable organization announced in 2013. Pictures on Wa Atasemo's social media accounts have shown the delivery of relief materials including blankets, food, and wheelchairs to Syrians in need. Wa Atasemo has called for donations of 950 Qatari Riyals (approximately $260) to support the campaign and its missions. In 2014, Mohammed al-Awadhi claimed that the charity had received donations from "kind people" in Qatar, Saudi Arabia, Kuwait, Bahrain, and the UAE.

Mohammed bin Hashim al-Awadhy's name and phone number is featured on the picture distributed on social media to promote the charity. In addition, al-Awadhy commonly promoted the campaign from his personal social media accounts. On Twitter, the Wa Atasemo account only follows the account of Mohammed al-Awadhy.

A large number of the accounts following Wa Atasemo's Twitter page are supporters of ISIS as well as other Salafist groups in Syria.

Death
Reports of Mohammed al-Awadhy's death surfaced in February 2014. It is reported that he was found dead in northern Syria on the path between Binnish and Taftanaz, two towns in the Idlib Governorate in northwestern Syria. Although al-Awadhy was referred to as a "Qatari recruit", it is unclear which group he was fighting for Syria. Multiple reports and social media posts have tied al-Awadhy to Ahrar al-Sham. However, al-Awadhy was also described as member of the "convoy of martyrs" by media outlets that support ISIS and a former member of the "Raqqa Province," the headquarters of ISIS.

References

Year of birth missing
2015 deaths
Qatari activists